Greta Christina (born 1961) is an American atheist, blogger, speaker, and author.

Early life
Christina was born in Chicago in 1961. She graduated from Reed College in 1983. She legally changed her name in her twenties, dropping her family name and taking her middle name as her last name.

Career
Christina has written for AlterNet, Free Inquiry, and The Humanist. She started writing her own "Greta Christina's blog" in 2005; it was later incorporated in to the Freethought Blogs network. In 2016 she co-founded The Orbit, which she described as "the first atheist media site founded explicitly to work on all forms of social justice". In 2009, Hemant Mehta at The Friendly Atheist ranked Christina's blog in the Top Ten most popular atheist blogs. She also created the "Atheist Meme of the Day" on Facebook.

She has been writing professionally since 1989, and has been a full-time freelance writer and speaker since 2012. Her writing about atheism has appeared in print in Skeptical Inquirer and the anthology Everything You Know About God Is Wrong, as well as in her own books Coming Out Atheist: How to Do It, How to Help Each Other, and Why (2014) and Why Are You Atheists So Angry?: 99 Things that Piss Off the Godless (2012).

Speaking to Chris Mooney for a Point of Inquiry podcast in 2012, she stated that "there isn't one emotion" affecting atheists "but anger is one of the emotions that many of us have ...[it] drives others to participate in the movement". She said that there are many goals for the atheist movementmore separation of church and state, ending "bigotry against atheism", and for some, persuading people "out of religion", and that it is a "valid goal" to work towards a world without religion.

As a speaker, she is a member of the Speakers Bureau for the Secular Student Alliance and the Center for Inquiry. She was a speaker on the Diversity in Skepticism panel at The Amaz!ng Meeting in July, 2011, the Reason Rally in 2012, and the 50th annual convention of American Atheists in 2013.

Rebecca Hensler founded the social media and internet support group 'Grief Beyond Belief' for grieving people who do not believe in God or an afterlife in 2011; she was encouraged to found it by Christina.

In 2013 Christina was named the International Team Honored Hero of the Foundation Beyond Belief (FBB). The Foundation's teams raise money for The Leukemia and Lymphoma Society. She is a past member of the Foundation Beyond Belief's Board of Directors.

She received the 2013 LGBT Humanist Pride Award from the American Humanist Association.

Also in 2013, a photo of Christina with her wife Ingrid and a piece about the photo by Christina was featured in the book A Better Life, by Christopher Johnson, which is a book with photos of 100 atheists and pieces by them about how their atheism has enabled them to have, in their view, a better life.

In 2015, Christina received the first Secular Student Alliance Ambassador Award, which was the 2015 Secular Student Alliance Ambassador Award. Christina is an Advisory Board member of the SSA and a donor at the Lifetime Membership level.

Outside of her atheist work, she is the editor of Paying For It: A Guide by Sex Workers for Their Clients and of the Best Erotic Comic anthology series, and has written the erotic novella Bending and the erotic fiction collection Bending: Dirty Kinky Stories About Pain, Power, Religion, Unicorns, & More. Her writing has also appeared in three volumes of Best American Erotica. She has also written about cats for Catster, and has written for the magazine Femme Feminism.

She previously worked at Last Gasp and Lusty Lady, both in San Francisco. She has also performed in pornography.

Personal life
Christina began living in the San Francisco Bay Area in 1984. She wrote in 2010 that she and her wife Ingrid had been "happily married" for "six and a half years (or five years, or two and a half years, depending on which of our three weddings in the shifting 'same- sex marriage' winds you're talking about)".

Christina is co-organizer and co-host of the Godless Perverts Story Hour and the Godless Perverts Social Club in San Francisco. She is openly polyamorous, and has written about participating in BDSM. She is openly bisexual/pansexual.

Christina's parents divorced when she was 12. Christina's mother died of cancer at the age of 45, when Christina was 17.
In 2012, Christina was diagnosed with endometrial cancer. She had a surgical hysterectomy and oophorectomy to treat it.

Christina has written that she has struggled with depression off and on throughout most of her adult life, and that she considers herself chronically depressed and expects to take antidepressants for the rest of her life.

Views on social issues

Christina writes that she is a sex-positive, pro-choice feminist and that she supports same-sex marriage and group marriage.

Books

References

External links
 
 Greta Christina's Blog at The Orbit
 
 
 

1961 births
American feminists
American atheism activists
Atheist feminists
BDSM writers
Living people
New Atheism
Pansexual women
Reed College alumni
20th-century atheists
21st-century atheists
Writers about religion and science
American LGBT writers
Bisexual feminists
Polyamorous people